Michael Gaunt is a former pornographic actor who appeared in many films during the Golden Age of Porn, including  Barbara Broadcast in 1977 and Maraschino Cherry in 1978.

Awards and nominations
1988 AVN Award – Best Supporting Actor – Firestorm II
1988 AVN Award – Best Actor – Cravings (nominated)

References

External links 
 

American male pornographic film actors
Living people
1946 births
Male actors from New York City